On Friday, May 15, 1981, Len Barker of the Cleveland Indians threw a perfect game against the Toronto Blue Jays at Cleveland Stadium, the 10th perfect game in Major League Baseball history. The Indians defeated the Blue Jays 3–0, as Barker did not allow a baserunner.  Barker never once reached ball three against any Blue Jay hitter. He struck out 11 Blue Jays hitters (all of them swinging) including seven of the last 11 batters.

Barker's perfect game is the most recent no-hitter thrown by a Cleveland pitcher.  "I run into people almost every day who want to talk about it," Barker said in 2006.  "Everyone says, 'You're probably tired of talking about it.'  I say, 'No, it's something to be proud of.'  It's a special thing." The Indians have the longest active no-hitter drought in MLB.

Barker was the first perfect game pitcher who did not come to bat during the entire game, with the American League having adopted the designated hitter in 1973.

Ron Hassey, Barker's catcher, would catch Dennis Martínez's perfect game in 1991, thus becoming the only catcher, to date, to catch two perfect games.

Danny Ainge, who would play 14 seasons in the NBA, was on the losing end of this game. He grounded out and struck out in his two at-bats; in the ninth inning, he was pinch-hit for by Alvis Woods, who struck out.

Boxscore

References

External links
 Box score at Baseball Reference

1981 Major League Baseball season
Major League Baseball perfect games
Cleveland Indians
1980s in Cleveland
May 1981 sports events in the United States
1981 in sports in Ohio
Baseball competitions in Cleveland